CustomMade is an online custom jeweler. Till 2015, the business operated as an online marketplace connects customers with independent artisans (called "custom makers") who produce custom-designed furniture, jewelry, home decor, and other personalized items. CustomMade is the world's first and largest online seller of custom products. They have 3,500 custom makers registered on the site and have raised a total $7.65 million in venture funding. On May 21, 2015, the business was acquired by Wayfair (NYSE: W) for an undisclosed sum after having raised $25.65MM in venture funding. In May 2017, it was announced that founder Seth Rosen had re-purchased the business out of foreclosure in partnership with Western Technology Investment (WTI) to focus on building the custom jewelry business.

Company history

Beginnings

Co-founders Michael Salguero and Seth Rosen met as undergraduates at Boston University, where both had a passion for custom-made shirts, belts, and pants. The two founders had careers in real estate and were looking for more exciting work. In January 2009, Salguero and Rosen bought the custommade.com URL for $140,000 from a woodworker who had owned and run the site since 1996. At the time of the purchase, the site hosted around 350 makers paying a small subscription fee to be on the site.  The site was generating about $35,000 a year in subscription sales. 

Early versions of CustomMade.com drew visitors, but only a small number of those visitors ordered items. CustomMade redesigned the site with help from Google Ventures and within a week, increased the number of paying projects by 200 percent. From 2009 to 2010, the number of visitors to the site tripled to a total of 1.5 million, and in 2010, CustomMade earned $350,000 in revenue.

In November 2011, CustomMade raised $2.1 million in Series A funding from First Round Capital, Google Ventures, and others. With the additional investment, CustomMade planned to expand its Lechmere Square headquarters by 5,000 square feet and its number of employees from 27 to over 50. At the time of the announcement, CustomMade had produced over $2 million in project requests.

In April 2012, CustomMade closed a $4 million funding round led by Google Ventures with additional investments from Schooner Capital, LaunchCapital, NextView Ventures, Andrew McCollum, and First Round Capital. CustomMade currently has over 3,500 custom makers on the site. As of April 2012, CustomMade has 3 million visitors a year and handles $2 million a month in transactions.

Site structure

Customers can browse listings and galleries based on criteria, including the function of that item, the proximity of the custom maker, or the type of material used in making the product. They can search by category, such as "wine-room design" or "custom tile mosaics," or by location, which gives the names of local custom makers. Potential customers can also post a proposed item to the site's Job Board so custom makers can bid for the chance to build it. Through the Job Board, customers can provide guidelines like time flexibility, price range, and a basic idea of the desired item. Users can also browse and choose from ready-made furniture, jewelry, glass, and metal objects. CustomMade builders are also available to build entire homes.

CustomMade also has a commercial gallery with work examples. The galleries show examples such as restaurant and office build-outs, conference tables, wine cellars, liturgical furnishings, gun cabinets, musical instruments, clocks, walking sticks, engagement rings, mirrors, frames, boats, and vases. Another Massachusetts customer commissioned the production of a "lobster tickler," a device for catching crustaceans.

Business model
In May 2017, CustomMade adjusted its strategic focus by deciding to focus exclusively on its custom jewelry design and manufacturing business. The Company removed all independent jewelers from its marketplace and opted to manufacture and designs its pieces for customers. However, they kept the marketplace open and operational for other categories like furniture and woodworking. In its marketplace business model, CustomMade takes a commission on each sale, and all of the custom makers featured on the site must get vetted before they can post their work. Unlike Etsy, which focuses on handmade products, CustomMade connects customers with makers who can build to the buyer's specifications. By paying a monthly fee and uploading samples of their work, craftsmen may get featured CustomMade. The average CustomMade product sells for about $1,500.

Reception
CustomMade was featured on CBS's list of the best Mother's Day gifts for 2011. Rich Miner, a partner at Google Ventures, said that CustomMade has "a huge runway to expand into a mass-market product."

The company's transaction volume was growing at approximately 50% each month and about $500,000 worth of projects are requested each week in 2012. A Maine-based woodworker said that his CustomMade subscription has "one thousand times paid for itself. I have work lined up until after Christmas."

References

External links
 CustomMade.com

Online jewelry retailers of the United States
Companies based in Cambridge, Massachusetts
Retail companies established in 1996
Internet properties established in 1996